Neverwhere is a radio drama based on the 1996 novel Neverwhere by Neil Gaiman.  It was dramatised by Dirk Maggs. The theme music is by James Hannigan.

Broadcast 
On Saturday 16 March 2013, BBC Radio 4 and BBC Radio 4 Extra broadcast the first, hour-long, episode of Neverwhere. The subsequent five half-hour episodes were broadcast throughout the following week on Radio 4 Extra (in Mono on DAB), and made available worldwide after broadcast on BBC iPlayer.
It was rebroadcast on BBC Radio 4 starting on Dec 25th 2013 and continuing for 6 days.

Cast

Episodes 
 London Below
 Earl's Court
 The Angel Islington
 The Black Friars
 Market Afloat
 The Key

Spin-off 
The short story How the Marquis Got His Coat Back was subsequently adapted in 2016. The cast included Paterson Joseph, Bernard Cribbins, Adrian Lester, Mitch Benn and Don Warrington.

Footnotes 

2013 in radio
Adaptations of works by Neil Gaiman
British radio dramas
Fantasy radio programs
Plays set in London
Radio programmes based on novels
Works by Neil Gaiman
BBC Radio 4 programmes
BBC Radio 4 Extra programmes